Max Fürst (June 2, 1905 – June 21, 1978) was a German author. He wrote about his boyhood in Königsberg and his friendship with Hans Litten.

Publications 
 Gefilte Fisch. Eine Jugend in Königsberg (1973) and Verlag der Nation, Husum (2002) 
 Talisman Scheherezade. Die schwierigen zwanziger Jahre (1976)
 Gefilte Fisch und wie es weiterging, dtv, Munich (2004) 
 "Hans Litten" in Sozialistische Warte, Vol. 13, 1938, No. 32 v. 12. August 1938, p. 758
 "Mein Judentum" in Mein Judentum. Selbstzeugnisse. Hans Jürgen Schultz (Ed.) Benzinger, Zurich (1999)

External links 
 
 Special exhibition Schwarzer Haufen at the House of the Wannsee Conference Memorial and Education Site

1905 births
1978 deaths
German male writers